Limited Edition is a remix album by Puerto Rican singer Yolandita Monge and the first ever of its kind by any Latin performer, male or female. 

It was produced and remixed by internationally known DJ - Producer Pablo Flores along with partner, Grammy winning Engineer Javier Garza.  The album includes the new Megamix and selected remixes from the previously released Maxi Singles of Por Tí, Fuiste Un Sueño and No Me Acostumbro. The cover is a new color painted photo from Vivencias by Raúl Torres.  It was released in 1991 and is out of print in all media formats.

Track listing

Credits and personnel

Vocals: Yolandita Monge
All Additional Production, Megamix and Remixes by Pablo Flores and Javier Garza for Hits' n' Mixes Productions
Artwork and Concept: Raúl Torres
Graphic Design: Luis Rafael Vázquez and Lydia Gregory

Notes

Track listing and credits from album cover.
Released in Cassette Format on 1991 (DIC-80601).
Released in CD Format on 1991 (CD-80601).

References

1991 remix albums
Yolandita Monge remix albums
CBS Records remix albums
Sony Music remix albums